Maine Gandhi Ko Nahin Mara is a 2005 Indian drama film, directed by Jahnu Barua and produced by Anupam Kher. The film stars Anupam Kher and Urmila Matondkar in lead roles.

In the film, a poem by noted Hindi poet, Sohan Lal Dwivedi, Koshish Karne Walon Ki Har Nahi Hoti (Those who have courage never fail) was depicted as the favorite poem of the main character.

Plot
The film explores the downward spiral of a retired Hindi professor, Uttam Chaudhary, (portrayed by Anupam Kher) as he falls victim to dementia. After he sees someone carelessly place an ash tray on a newspaper photograph of Mohandas Gandhi, his senility increases. One night his daughter Trisha, played by Urmila Matondkar, and son Karan discover his room on fire. Trisha takes him to a doctor who says nothing can be done.

Then Uttam believes he killed Gandhi by accidentally playing with a toy gun which had real bullets and shooting Gandhi during his walk in Birla House. So they go see Uttam's brother for details. Uttam's brother says that when they were young, they played darts by filling ballons with red dye and placing it on someone's picture.

One day someone found Gandhi's picture and Uttam popped a balloon while their father saw who believed he killed Gandhi, with Uttam replying "Maine Gandhi Ko Nahin Mara" while his father hit him. Later they go to another doctor named Siddharth (Parvin Dabas) who helps Uttam when he thinks that his house is jail and people poisoned his food because he killed Gandhi. Siddharth eats the food so Uttam knows the food is not poisoned. Later, in court, a gun expert says that a toy gun (which Uttam believes he killed Gandhi with) cannot kill anyone.

Response
The movie did not do well at the box office. However, it was much appreciated by audiences and critics. Anupam Kher received critical acclaim for his performance and won a Special Jury Award at the National Film Awards. He also received awards at several international film festivals. Matondkar was also much appreciated for playing the caring daughter of Kher and won the Bollywood Movie Award - Best Actress for her performance.

Cast
Anupam Kher as Professor Uttam Chaudhary
Urmila Matondkar as Trisha Chaudhary
Rajit Kapur as Ronu Chaudhary
Parvin Dabas as Dr. Siddarth Katari
Prem Chopra
Waheeda Rahman
Boman Irani
Sudhir Joshi
Raju Kher
Vishwas Paandya
Nazneen Ghaani
Danica Apolline as charity worker

See also
List of artistic depictions of Mohandas Karamchand Gandhi

References

External links

BBC review
Rediff review

2005 films
Cultural depictions of Mahatma Gandhi
2000s Hindi-language films
Films scored by Bappi Lahiri
Films distributed by Yash Raj Films
Films directed by Jahnu Barua